George Fulcher may refer to:

George Avis Fulcher (1922–1984), American clergyman of the Roman Catholic Church
George Williams Fulcher (1795–1855), English poet and miscellaneous writer